Two Royal Navy ships have borne the name HMS Pomona:

 , the 18-gun French sloop-of-war Cheveret captured on 30 January 1761 and wrecked in a hurricane in 1776.
 , a 28-gun  sixth-rate frigate launched in 1778. She was renamed Amphitrite in 1795 and broken up in 1811.

See also

References

Royal Navy ship names